Williamsdale may refer to:
Williamsdale, Australian Capital Territory
Williamsdale, Nova Scotia, Canada
Williamsdale, Ohio, United States